Admiral John Robert Ebenezer Pattisson (10 December 1844 – 13 February 1928) was a Royal Navy officer.

Pattison was promoted to rear-admiral on 26 October 1899, to vice-admiral on 26 November 1904, and retired from the navy on the following day. He was later promoted admiral on the retired list on 30 June 1908.

References 

1844 births
1928 deaths
Royal Navy admirals
Place of birth missing
Place of death missing
Royal Navy personnel of the Anglo-Egyptian War